Red Roses For Me is a single by The Dubliners and Niamh Kavanagh charting at No.13 in the Irish Charts in 1994. This was the last single Ronnie Drew would ever release with The Dubliners.

Charts

References

The Dubliners songs
1994 songs